Stacy Gore (born May 20, 1963) is an American athlete who punted for the Miami Dolphins during the 1987 season.

References

Arkansas State Red Wolves football players
Miami Dolphins players
American football punters
National Football League replacement players
Living people
1963 births